Okolocha Esowese Dike professionally known as Eso Dike is a Nigerian actor, musician, television personality, lawyer and media entrepreneur. He is known for his role as Tsola in The Smart Money Woman (2020), Leye in Ndani TV's Game On, (2020), Malik in Africa Magic's Ricordi (2021). He was one of the highest grossing Nollywood actors in the year 2022 after starring in Ijakumo, The Wildflower and The Stand Up; all of which combined, made upwards of ₦300 million Naira at the Nigerian box office.

Early life
He attended the University of Benin, where he studied Law and graduated obtaining an LL.B before proceeding to the Nigerian Law School, Abuja, where he graduated and obtained a B.L, and was called to the Nigerian Bar.

Career
Dike got a job as an intern at Spice TV after graduating from law school. After several auditions, in 2016 Dike joined Nigerian television series, Tinsel.

Filmography

References

Nigerian male actors
Nigerian musicians
University of Benin (Nigeria) alumni
Year of birth missing (living people)
Living people